Chaumont-en-Vexin (literally Chaumont in Vexin) is a commune in the Oise department in northern France.

Rulers 
 Walo II (*1060; † 1098), viscount of Chaumont-en-Vexin and constable of King Philip I of France

See also
 Communes of the Oise department
 Vexin

References

Communes of Oise